Flag Hill Distillery & Winery is located in Lee, New Hampshire, United States.  It is the largest vineyard in the state. Flag Hill was the first legal distillery in New Hampshire after Prohibition.

History
The land where Flag Hill is located has been farmed since the 18th century, and was formerly a dairy farm. Frank Reinhold Sr. bought  in the area in 1950, and in 1985 his son Frank Reinhold Jr. took over the property with the hope of growing grapes, which he began planting in 1990. The first harvest took place in 1994 and was released in 1996.

Flag Hill winery was the second winery to open in New Hampshire, preceded only by Jewell Towne Vineyards.

A barn dating to the late 18th century hosts the winery and tasting room.

The winery grows French-American hybrids such as DeChaunac, Marechal Foch and Vignoles, as well as American hybrids such as Cayuga White and La Crescent. These varietals are more resistant to cold winters.

See also
New Hampshire wine

References

External links
Flag Hill Winery

Wineries in New Hampshire